Nashville is an unincorporated community in Lincoln County, Oregon, United States. Its post office opened in 1888 and closed in 1978 and is now served by the Blodgett, Oregon, 97326 post office. It was founded by Wallis Nash, who came from England to settle in Oregon in 1879. He died in Nashville in 1926.

Further reading
 Nash, Wallis.  Oregon:  There and Back in 1877.   Corvallis, Oregon:  Oregon State University Press, 1976 (Reprint of 1878 ed.). Project Gutenberg free ebook

References

Unincorporated communities in Lincoln County, Oregon
1888 establishments in Oregon
Populated places established in 1888
Unincorporated communities in Oregon